KMDG (105.7 FM) is a radio station broadcasting a Catholic radio format. Licensed to Hays, Kansas, United States, the station serves the West Kansas area. The station is currently owned by Divine Mercy Radio, Inc.

The then-KRMR went silent in December 2019 following the termination of Radioactive, LLC's operating agreement with Rocking M Radio. The station was then sold to Divine Mercy Radio, owners of KVDM (88.1 FM) in Hays, for $52,000. The station changed its call sign to KMDG on July 21, 2020.

References

External links
 

MDG
Catholic radio stations
Radio stations established in 2008
2008 establishments in Kansas
Hays, Kansas
Catholic Church in Kansas